Bourdon is a surname. Notable people with the surname include:

Amé Bourdon (1636 or 1638–1706), French physician and anatomist
Benjamin B. Bourdon (1860–1943), French psychologist
Eugene Bourdon (1870–1916), French architect
Eugène Bourdon (1808–1884), French watchmaker and engineer
François Louis Bourdon (1758 – June 22, 1797), revolutionary French politician
Luc Bourdon (1987–2008), Canadian hockey player
Luc Bourdon (b. 1952), Canadian documentary filmmaker
Rob Bourdon, the drummer of Linkin Park
Rosario Bourdon (1885–1961), Québécois musician
Sébastien Bourdon (1616–1671), French painter
William Bourdon (born 1956), French lawyer, secretary-general of the International Federation of Human Rights Leagues from 1995 to 2000, and founder of Sherpa (association)

French-language surnames